Jan Hellriegel is a singer/songwriter based in Auckland, New Zealand.

Her first recorded appearances were in Dunedin band Working With Walt in the mid-1980s when Jan studied at the University of Otago in Dunedin. She then formed all-woman band Cassandra's Ears, moving back to Auckland and going solo in the early 90s.

Hellriegel has released four solo studio albums, It's My Sin 1992, Tremble 1995, All Grown Up 2009, and Sportsman of the Year in 2019.

She has toured with and supported many international acts including The Cure, Jeff Buckley, David Byrne, Diesel, and Ron Sexsmith.

She has also performed as a guest vocalist for many bands such as Straitjacket Fits, The Verlaines and The Mutton Birds, notably on the latter's hit single Nature.

History

Early
Jan Hellriegel was born and raised in West Auckland with her three brothers and attended Henderson High School. She famously worked in her father's panel beating shop, though only in the office. Nonetheless, the combination of her birthplace and early employment led to her being branded a "Westie" by the New Zealand media.

Jan took vocal training in speech and singing at St. Mary’s College, Auckland under Sister Mary Leo. She then moved to Dunedin in the 1980s to attend the University of Otago, where she graduated with a Bachelor of Arts.

While in Dunedin, she joined her brother Rob Hellriegel's band, Working With Walt. She performed backing vocals, piano and guitar on their 1984 7" LP The Prophet and wrote and performed the song "Christina" on the band’s 1985 LP 4 Sides.

In 1988, Jan performed backing vocals on the Leonard Cohen song "So Long Marianne", performed by Straitjacket Fits.

Cassandra’s Ears

In the late 1980s Jan formed the band Cassandra's Ears with Dunedin bandmates Flick Rhind (bass), Zan Wright (backing vocals), Vanessa Anich (drums) and Leanne Ibell (guitar). Jan wrote music and lyrics and performed vocals, guitar and keyboards.

Their first release was the song "Replacements" for the National Student Radio 1986 compilation, Weird Culture Weird Custom. The band played local gigs, toured New Zealand, wrote more material, and eventually released two EPs, Private Wasteland in 1988 and Your Estimation in 1990.

Cassandra's Ears reformed in November 2010 for a one-off show in Auckland to support the release of "The Cassandra's Ears Story".

Solo career

Hellriegel signed with Warner Records New Zealand in 1990. Her first album, It’s My Sin, was recorded December 1991 - January 1992 at Mountain Studios (Tauranga), Airforce Studios (Auckland), Mandrill Studios, Helen Young Studios and Auckland Audio (Auckland). The album was released in 1992, along with singles  "The Way I Feel", "It’s My Sin" and "No Idea". There was also a promotional EP for "All the Best Thoughts", and the songs "Westy Gals" and "Wings of Steel" were released as radio-only singles. She also recorded backing vocals for the 1992 hit song "Nature" by The Mutton Birds.

In 1995, Jan recorded a television advertisement for Coca-Cola before completing her second album, Tremble, at Sing Sing (Melbourne) and Studios 301 (Sydney) in 1995. The album was released the same year along with singles for the songs "Manic (is a state of mind) ", "Geraldine" and "Pure Pleasure". In 1996 Jan was awarded Most Promising Female Vocalist at the New Zealand Music Awards, and Top Female Vocalist and Single of the Year (for Manic) at the Music and Entertainer Awards of New Zealand.

In 1997, Jan recorded a television advertisement for Ford, a cover version of the Gordon Mills song "10 Guitars" for a Television New Zealand documentary of the same name, and the song "Unravelled" for the short film "My Geraldine" by former Cassandra's Ears bandmate Flick Rhind. She also recorded a new single, "Sentimental Fool", at York Street A&B Studios (Auckland) for release that year.

Jan subsequently parted ways with Warner Records, and her last single, "Melusine", recorded at Beaver Studios (Auckland) was released by Universal Records in 1998. That year, Jan was nominated for the Fox of the Year award on the Mikey Havoc show.

In 1999, Jan joined the Alan Duff Charitable Foundation Duffy Books in Homes programme as a celebrity spokesperson. She co-wrote the theme song "Read About It" with Dave Dobbyn and Toi Iti, which is still performed by 100,000 children annually. During that year she played a non-musical acting role on Shortland Street, playing Jackie, an abused wife.

In 2000, Jan appeared in the New Zealand television Street Legal and in 2001 she became involved in a collaboration with Tom Blaxland called Project Runway. In 2002, she wrote and recorded the song "Star Baby" for children’s clothing label Pumpkin Patch.

In early 2009 Jan went into Roundhead Studios in Auckland to record a third album with a line-up of musicians including producer Wayne Bell, Nick Gaffaney on drums, Brett Adams and Ben Fulton on guitars, Eddie Rayner and Michael Larsen on piano/keyboards, and Mark Hughes on bass. Special guests included Kiri Eriwata, Callie Blood and Jackie Clarke on backing vocals. The album was engineered and mixed by Neil Baldock and was mastered by Greg Calbi at Stirling Sound in New York.

Jan released the new album "All Grown Up" on her own record label, Blind Date Records, in October 2009 to critical acclaim from New Zealand music reviewers. "Melusine" was re-released by Blind Date Records in 2010.

The album "Lost Songs" was released in April 2013.  A collection of previously unreleased material - demos, live sessions and studio work from 1990 - 2000 which Hellriegel had remastered from DAT and cassette recordings.

Sportsman of the Year

Hellriegel announced and released a new multi-media project through April and May 2019. "Sportsman of the Year" was composed of a studio album and book of the same name. "Sportsman of the Year" was also serialised as podcasts, produced by Radio New Zealand and presented by Jan Hellriegel.

In interviews around the release, Hellriegel said that the book grew out of the album project when she realised that the songs were taking a more philosophical, personal direction and wanted to share some stories in parallel with the music, each informed by the other.

Business career

Jan Hellriegel was appointed NZ General Manager of Australia-based Native Tongue Music Publishing in 2010 and ran the company’s NZ operations until 2013 when she left to develop Aeroplane Music Services, a music licensing and supervision business.

In 2015 Hellriegel announced Songbroker, an 'artist-friendly' music publishing company focused on providing music by NZ songwriters to film, TV and content producers Songbroker represents the musical rights and recorded works of several hundred NZ composers and songwriters.

In 2019 the National Library of NZ and Douglas Lilburn Trust announced that Songbroker would be entrusted with representing the works of acclaimed New Zealand composer, the late Douglas Lilburn.

She has served terms as a director of Independent Music NZ (IMNZ) and Recorded Music NZ (RMNZ) and is an APRA Ambassador.

Discography

Albums

With Cassandra's Ears 

 The Cassandra's Ears Story (2010)

Singles

Television

Other than interview or performance appearances, Jan Hellriegel has occasionally dabbled in acting.

1997 – Xena character: NemoSyne, Goddess of Memory.
1997 – Television New Zealand documentary "10 Guitars": herself.
1997 – Television New Zealand 7 August edition of "Assignment": herself.
1998 – MTV New Zealand "Closedown Show": herself.
1999 – Xena character: Hestia, Virgin Goddess.
1999 – Shortland Street character: Jackie, an abused wife.
2000 – Street Legal character: unknown.

References

External links
Jan Hellriegel's Official Homepage
AudioCulture profile

Living people
21st-century New Zealand women singers
University of Otago alumni
Year of birth missing (living people)
People educated at Henderson High School, Auckland
20th-century New Zealand women singers